Roger Matthews (1948 – 7 April 2020), was a British criminologist. He was a Professor of Criminology at the University of Kent, Canterbury, United Kingdom. Prior to joining the University of Kent, he was a professor of criminology at London South Bank University and Middlesex University.

Matthews is known as one of the key figures in left realism, a criminological critique of both the dominant administrative criminology and the critical criminology ("left idealism").

He died on 7 April 2020 at the age of 71 from the effects of the COVID-19 virus.

Publications

Matthews, R. & Young, J. (eds) (1986) Confronting Crime, London: Sage Publications
Matthews, R. (1988) Informal Justice?, London: Sage
Matthews, R. (1988) Privatizing Criminal Justice, London: Sage
Matthews, R. (1988) 'Alternatives to and in Prison: a Realist approach' In: Carlen, P. & Cook, D. eds. Paying For Crime, Milton Keynes: Open University Press
Matthews, R. & Young, J. (eds) (1992) Rethinking Criminology: The Realist Debate, (Sage Contemporary Criminology) London: Sage. 
Matthews, R. & Young, J. (eds) (1992) Issues in Realist Criminology, (Sage Contemporary Criminology) London: Sage. 
Matthews, R. and P. Francis (eds) (1996) Prisons 2000: An International Perspective on the Current State and Future of Imprisonment.      Macmillan.  
Matthews, R. (1999) Doing Time: An Introduction to the Sociology of Imprisonment. Macmillan/Palgrave. .
 Matthews, R. and Pitts, J. (eds) (2001) Crime, Disorder and Community Safety: A New Agenda? Routledge.
 Matthews, R. (2002) Armed Robbery. Willan. 
 Matthews, R. & Young, J. (2003) The New Politics of Crime and Punishment, Willan. 
 Matthews, R. (2005) 'The Myth of Punitiveness', Theoretical Criminology, 9(2): 175–20
 Matthews, R. Easton, H. Briggs, D. and Pease, K. (2007)  "Assessing the Impact of Anti-Social Behaviour Orders": Policy Press 
 Matthews, R. (2008) Prostitution, Politics and Policy. Routledge-Cavendish. .
 Matthews, R. (2009) Doing Time: An Introduction to the Sociology of Imprisonment''' Second Edition. Palgrave/Macmillan. 
 Matthews, R. (2009) 'Beyond "So What?" Criminology: Rediscovering Realism' Theoretical Criminology'' 13 (3):341-62.
 Matthews, R. (2010) 'Realist Criminology Revisited" in E. McLaughlin and T. Newburn (eds) The Sage Handbook of Criminological Theory.

References
http://www.rogermatthews.net
https://www.kent.ac.uk/social-policy-sociology-social-research/people/1926/matthews-roger

British criminologists
Academics of the University of Kent
1948 births
2020 deaths
Deaths from the COVID-19 pandemic in England